Raven Rock is an unincorporated community in Pleasants County, in the U.S. state of West Virginia.

History
A post office called Raven Rock was established in 1878, and remained in operation until 1968. The community took its name from a raven's nest perched high above the original town site.

References

Unincorporated communities in Pleasants County, West Virginia
Unincorporated communities in West Virginia